Anton Davydenko (born 16 August 1996, in Kyiv, Ukraine) is a Ukrainian male trampoline gymnast and member of the national team. He is medalist of the European Games and European Championships.

Davydenko graduated from the National University of Ukraine on Physical Education and Sport.

References

1996 births
Living people
Ukrainian male trampolinists
European Games silver medalists for Ukraine
Gymnasts at the 2019 European Games
Gymnasts from Kyiv
European Games medalists in gymnastics